The 69th Infantry Division, nicknamed the "fighting 69th," was a Division of the United States Army formed during World War II. It is distinct from the 69th Infantry Regiment (New York) (the "Fighting 69th").

The shoulder sleeve insignia of the division was designed by its then commander Maj. Gen. Charles L. Bolte with the red, white and blue being the colors of the United States forming a "6" and a "9".

World War II
Activated: 15 May 1943. Camp Shelby, Mississippi
Overseas: December 1944.
Campaigns: Rhineland, Central Europe
Days of combat: 86.
Awards:
 Distinguished Service Cross-5
 Distinguished Service Medal (U.S. Army)-1
 Silver Star Medal-105
 Legion of Merit Medal-3
 Soldier's Medal-12
 Bronze Star Medal-2,253
 Air Medal-33.
Commanders:
Maj. Gen. Charles L. Bolte (May 1943 – September 1944),
Maj. Gen. Emil F. Reinhardt (September 1944 – August 1945),
Brig. Gen. Robert V. Maraist (August 1945 to inactivation).
Returned to U.S.: 13 September 1945.
Inactivated: 16 September 1945.

Order of battle

 Headquarters, 69th Infantry Division
 271st Infantry Regiment
 272nd Infantry Regiment
 273rd Infantry Regiment
 Headquarters and Headquarters Battery, 69th Infantry Division Artillery
 724th Field Artillery Battalion (105 mm)
 879th Field Artillery Battalion (105 mm)
 880th Field Artillery Battalion (105 mm)
 881st Field Artillery Battalion (155 mm)
 269th Engineer Combat Battalion
 369th Medical Battalion
 69th Cavalry Reconnaissance Troop (Mechanized)
 Headquarters, Special Troops, 69th Infantry Division
 Headquarters Company, 69th Infantry Division
 769th Ordnance Light Maintenance Company
 69th Quartermaster Company
 569th Signal Company
 Military Police Platoon
 Band
 69th Counterintelligence Corps Detachment

Combat chronicle 

The 69th Infantry Division arrived in England, 12 December 1944, where it continued its training.

It landed in Le Havre, France, 24 January 1945, and moved to Belgium to relieve the 99th Division, 12 February, and hold defensive positions in the Siegfried Line. The division went over to the attack, 27 February, capturing the high ridge east of Prether to facilitate use of the Hellenthal-Hollerath Highway.

In a rapid advance to the east, the 69th took Schmidtheim and Dahlem, 7 March. The period from 9 to 21 March was spent in mopping up activities and training. The division resumed its forward movement to the west bank of the Rhine, crossing the river and capturing the fortress of Ehrenbreitstein, 27 March.

It relieved the 80th Division in Kassel, 7 April, seized Hannoversch Münden on the 8th and Weissenfels on the 14th against sharp opposition, and captured Leipzig, 19 April, following a fierce struggle within the city. Eilenburg fell, 23 April, and the east bank of the Mulde River was secured.

Two days later, division patrols in the area between the Elbe and the Mulde Rivers contacted elements of the Soviet 5th Guards Army at Strehla, in the vicinity of Riesa and again at Torgau on Elbe Day. Until VE-day, the 69th patrolled and policed its area. Occupation duties were given to the division until it left for home and inactivation 7 September.

Casualties
Total battle casualties: 1,506
Killed in action: 341
Wounded in action: 1,146
Missing in action: 9
Prisoner of war: 10

Training division
In 1954 the 69th Division was reactivated under Major general Cornelius E. Ryan as a training division at Fort Dix, New Jersey replacing the 9th Infantry Division that was sent to Europe.  the 69th was deactivated in March 1956. The shoulder patch of the 69th was worn by the actors playing soldiers on The Phil Silvers Show.

References
The Army Almanac: A Book of Facts Concerning the Army of the United States U.S. Government Printing Office, 1950 reproduced at http://www.history.army.mil/html/forcestruc/cbtchron/cbtchron.html.

Notes

External links
http://www.69th-infantry-division.com/

069th Infantry Division, U.S.
Infantry Division, U.S. 069
Infantry divisions of the United States Army in World War II
Military units and formations established in 1943
Military units and formations disestablished in 1956